Travis Lamont Taylor (born March 30, 1979) is an American former college and professional football player who was a wide receiver in the National Football League (NFL) for eight seasons during the 2000s.  Taylor played college football for the University of Florida.  A first-round pick in the 2000 NFL Draft, he played professionally for the Baltimore Ravens, Minnesota Vikings, Oakland Raiders and St. Louis Rams of the NFL.

Early years 

Taylor was born in Fernandina Beach, Florida.  He started his high school career at Camden County High School in Camden County, Georgia, but transferred to Jean Ribault High School in Jacksonville, Florida.  As a senior at Ribault High School, Taylor was a first team Class 4A All-State selection, won All-America honors from SuperPrep, and was named to The Florida Times-Union Area Super 24 Team.

College career 

Taylor accepted an athletic scholarship to attend the University of Florida in Gainesville, Florida, where he played for coach Steve Spurrier's Florida Gators football team from 1997 to 1999.  Taylor compiled seventy-two receptions for 1,150 yards and fifteen touchdowns in eleven career starts, and also earned Most Valuable Player honors in the 1999 Orange Bowl with seven catches for 159 yards and two touchdowns; in the 2000 Florida Citrus Bowl, he made eleven catches for 156 yards and three touchdowns.  As a junior in 1999, he was selected as one of the Gators' team captains.

Professional career

Baltimore Ravens 

The Baltimore Ravens selected Taylor in the first round (tenth pick overall) in the 2000 NFL Draft; he was the third receiver taken in the 2000 draft. The Ravens had high hopes of him making an immediate impact. That season, Taylor showed early promise for himself and for his team by scoring two touchdowns in the second game of the season, a shootout victory over the Jacksonville Jaguars—a team the Ravens had never beaten. In 2000, the Ravens would go on to win Super Bowl XXXV. Baltimore released Taylor after a lackluster 2004 season.

Minnesota Vikings 

Taylor was then picked up by the Minnesota Vikings, where he played the 2005 and 2006 seasons and led the team in receiving both years. In 32 games (29 starts) with the team, Taylor caught 107 passes for 1,255 yards and seven touchdowns. He became a free agent in the 2007 offseason.

Oakland Raiders 

On May 22, 2007, Taylor was signed by the Oakland Raiders. He was inactive for the team's season opener, then played in the team's Week 2 contest but recorded no statistics. He was released on September 22.

St. Louis Rams 

Taylor worked out for the New Orleans Saints on October 11, 2007, but was not signed. He was signed by the St. Louis Rams a week later. He appeared in one game for the team, catching one pass for four yards and recording a solo tackle on special teams. The Rams released him in November.

Carolina Panthers 

On December 26, 2007, the Carolina Panthers signed Taylor to a two-year contract. He was inactive for the team's regular season finale. He was released from the team on August 30, 2008.

Detroit Lions 

Taylor was signed by the Detroit Lions on December 16, 2008 after wide receiver Shaun McDonald was placed on injured reserve. He was released on May 4, 2009.

During his eight-season NFL career, Taylor played in 101 regular season games, and started ninety of them.  He had 312 career receptions for 4,017 yards and twenty-two touchdowns; he also had thirty-two carries for 232 rushing yards.

NFL statistics

Regular season

Postseason

See also 

 Florida Gators football, 1990–99  	
 List of Baltimore Ravens first-round draft picks	
 List of Detroit Lions players
 List of Florida Gators in the NFL Draft

References 

1979 births
Living people
People from Fernandina Beach, Florida
Players of American football from Jacksonville, Florida
Jean Ribault High School alumni
American football wide receivers
Florida Gators football players
Baltimore Ravens players
Minnesota Vikings players
Oakland Raiders players
St. Louis Rams players
Carolina Panthers players
Detroit Lions players